Lake Colby is a  lake, located on NY-86 just outside the village of Saranac Lake, in Franklin County, New York in the Adirondacks; its outlet feeds into Lower Saranac Lake.  Lake Colby is also the name of a hamlet located just north of the lake on NY-86.

The village beach of Saranac Lake is on Lake Colby, and New York State operates a boat launch and fishing access; there is a ten horsepower limit for motorboats. Harrietstown operates Latour Park on its shore, providing picnicking and shore fishing. Less than 8% of its  of shoreline is privately owned.  There are two approved campsites on the lake.

Camp Colby, the Lake Colby Environmental Education Camp for 11- to 13-year-olds, is located on the western shore. Originally a private estate built by theatrical agent William Morris, whose clients were invited there for rest and relaxation, it was then known as Camp Intermission. Camp Colby opened as a boy's conservation education camp in 1963; in 1971 it became co-educational.

The Adirondack Medical Center hospital is located on the eastern shore of Lake Colby.

External links
   
 New York State Department of Environmental Conservation, Camp Colby, The Lake Colby Environmental Education Camp

Adirondacks
Colby
Colby
Saranac Lake, New York